Riverquarter is a small hamlet in the south of Kilkenny in Southeast Ireland.  Within the townland of Clonmore, it is part of the Catholic parish and electoral district of Mooncoin.

The area overlooks the River Suir, and the river can be reached from a minor access road.

See also
 List of towns and villages in Ireland
 List of Market Houses in Ireland

References

Towns and villages in County Kilkenny